Kamal Thapa is a Nepalese politician belonging to Rastriya Prajatantra Party Nepal.  

Thapa, has served as a Deputy Prime Minister and Federal Affairs and Local Development. Thapa is also the president of Nepal's Hindu nationalist party, the Rastriya Prajatantra Party Nepal.

Ideology 
He served as a Home Minister during King Gyanendra's direct rule in 2006 until the king was forced to handover power to Girija Prasad Koirala of the Nepali Congress Party and his allies with Communist Party of Nepal (Unified Marxist–Leninist) and Unified Communist Party of Nepal (Maoist). Thapa and his party called for a re-establishment of the monarchy through a referendum vote. Thapa claimed that no political parties in Nepal have the courage to safeguard Nepali nationality, claiming: "Now the onus lies only with the institution of monarchy to safeguard Nepali sovereignty and national unity."

He had also challenged the government to re-investigate the royal massacre: "Those blaming former King Gyanendra Shah for the massacre are now holding power in the government. I challenge them to track down the guilty." RPP-N organised bandh (Close Down) on 22 February 2010 as part of its agitation demanding timely promulgation of constitution, end of current problems like load shedding and the current political deadlock and referendum on some key issues to be incorporated in the new constitution including constitutional monarchy, Hindu nation and federalism.

Personal life
Kamal Thapa belongs to the Suyal Thapa clan. Kamal Thapa was born on 4 August 1955 in Kathmandu. He was born to a family with an army background. His father Chhatra Bahadur Thapa was a Colonel in the Royal Nepal Army while his mother was a homemaker. He has two brothers and five sisters. His elder brother is Lt General (Retd) Netra Bahadur Thapa while his younger brother is former President of All Nepal Football Association Ganesh Thapa, who has been involved in the development of football as a professional sport in Nepal.

Early career
Kamal Thapa represented Nepal as a football player having played for Narayani Zone and Sankata Boys Sports Club. He also became the captain of the National Football Team.

Kamal Thapa started his career as the president of National Student Organization during 1973–74. In 1977, he was the Assistant Lecturer for Political Economy in Institute of Forestry under Tribhuwan University, Nepal. He was the member of Constitution Reform Commission in 1980. He has also been the member secretary of Central Committee of National Youth Service Fund. He was also a cabinet member during the Panchayat rule, rising to the hold portfolios in the Ministry of Foreign Affairs, Ministry of Local Development and Ministry of Housing and Physical Planning.

He was the member of Parliament during 1986–1990 and 1995–1998. He was the spokesman for Rastriya Prajatantra Party (1992–2002) and general secretary in 2003.

He was also a national level football player in his early days. He also served as the president of All Nepal Football Association (1978–87) and as member of National Sports Council (1977–1987). He was also the executive member of Asian Football Confederation (1982–1990).

Currently, he is the chairman of newly formed Rastriya Prajatantra Party.

Political career

Relationship with King Gyanendra
Kamal Thapa is known to have a good relationship with ex-monarch Gyanendra Shah, as Kamal Thapa actively took part in the government as homeminister under Shah. But, Gyanendra Shah and Kamal Thapa have never been spotted together publicly after Nepal became a republic. Kamal Thapa still voices for the need of Kingship in a country like Nepal where there are diverse group of people. Thapa states -" I do not voice for king but rather for royal institution (राजसंस्था ) ". In his statement-"म राजा होइन राजसंस्थाको कुरा गरिरहेको छु"

Deputy prime minister

He holds the office of deputy prime minister of Nepal in cabinet of Khadga Prasad Sharma Oli on 12 October 2015.

Forming of Rastriya Prajatantra Party-Nepal
Rastriya Prajatantra Party was established on 15th Jestha, 2047 B.S. with an objective of providing an alternative democratic force to the nation. Nationalism, democracy and liberalism have remained as the three main ideological pillars of the party. Similarly, sovereignty of the people, competitive multi-party democracy, constitutional monarchy and the principle of rule of law are the political belief of the party. Despite having common agreement on major political issues, unfortunately, due to some technical differences two separate organizations with identical name, ideology and statute came into existence on the same day. Two RPPs contested the general election of 2048 B.S. separately. Obviously the results were not encouraging. Following the serious debacle in the election, under the pressure of party workers two RPPs decided to merge.

RPP held its first general convention in 2050 B.S. in Kathmandu, and unanimously elected former prime-minister Surya Bahadur Thapa as chairman. Former prime-minister Lokendra Bahadur Chand and Rajeshore Devkota were elected respectively as leader and co-chairman of the party. As provided in the party statute Padma Sundar Lawati was nominated as vice-chairman and Rabindra Nath Sharma, Pashupati Shamsher Rana and Prakash Chandra Lohani were nominated as general secretaries. Kamal Thapa became spokesman.

In the second general election held in 2051 B.S. united RPP secured eighteen percent of the total votes polled. Thus RPP became the third largest party in the parliament. Since none of the parties got absolute majority it was a hung parliament. The political developments that took place during the tenure of the second parliament gave opportunities for two RPP leaders namely Surya Bahadur Thapa and Lokendra Bahadur Chand to become the prime-minister of the country successively in the coalition governments. However, during this period the party saw serious differences among the top leadership, which eventually led once again for formal split of the party.

The second general convention of the party took place in 2054 B.S. in Birgunj. The Birgunj convention elected Surya Bahadur Thapa once again as chairman. Prakash Chandra Lohani, Pashupati Shamsher Rana and Kamal Thapa were nominated as vice-chairman, general secretary and spokesman respectively. Since two RPPs once again fought the general election with separate identity, the performance naturally were not good. However, it succeeded in retaining its third position in the parliament. Following the general election two factions again merged.

The third general convention held in Pokhara in 2059 B.S. elected Pashupati Samshere Rana as chairman. According to the party statute Padam Sunder Lawoti, Kamal Thapa and Roshan Karki were nominated as vice-chairman, general secretary and spokesperson.

The first-ever special general convention of the party took place in 2062 B.S. in Kathmandu. The special general convention passed a vote of no confidence motion against Pashupati Shamsher Rana and elected Kamal Thapa as chairman of the party. Padma Sunder Lawoti became the vice-chairman of the party.

Chairman Kamal Thapa resigned from his post and Rabindra Nath Sharma became the chairman of the party on 10th Karkik, 2063. Rabindra Nath Sharma resigned from the post of chairman because of his poor health by the second week of Falgun, 2064 and the chairmanship of the party was handed over to Kamal Thapa again.

References

Living people
1955 births
People from Makwanpur District
Nepalese Hindus
Government ministers of Nepal
Rastriya Prajatantra Party politicians
Foreign Ministers of Nepal
Deputy Prime Ministers of Nepal
Nepal MPs 1994–1999
Members of the Rastriya Panchayat
Members of the 2nd Nepalese Constituent Assembly